John Geggus (26 November 1889 — 2 December 1951) was a footballer who played as goalkeeper for Custom House, West Ham United and Gravesend United.

Club career
Geggus played 31 times for West Ham United in the Southern League, keeping nine clean sheets in total. Geggus' departure from West Ham was marred by his refusal to continue the game against Leyton on 9 April 1912 after being on the receiving end of disparaging comments from the West Ham support. Geggus' place was taken by Joseph Hughes and Geggus played only once more for West Ham.

Personal life
Geggus is the paternal grandfather of Cockney Rejects vocalist Jeff Turner.

References

1889 births
1951 deaths
Footballers from West Ham
English footballers
Association football goalkeepers
West Ham United F.C. players
Gravesend United F.C. players
Southern Football League players